Mohammed VI (701) is a FREMM multipurpose frigate of the Royal Moroccan Navy.

Development and design 
Three original variants of the FREMM were proposed; an anti-submarine variant (ASW), a general-purpose variant (GP), and a land-attack variant (AVT) to replace the existing classes of frigates within the French and Italian navies. A total of 27 FREMM were to be constructed - 17 for France and 10 for Italy - with additional aims to seek exports, however budget cuts and changing requirements has seen this number drop significantly for France, while the order for Italy remained unchanged. The land-attack variant (AVT) was subsequently cancelled.

On 24 October 2007 it was announced that the Royal Moroccan Navy had ordered one FREMM to replace its . The contract was signed on 18 April 2008 and construction of the Moroccan FREMM began in the summer 2008 with delivery expected in 2012 or 2013. The Moroccan ship is similar to the French anti-submarine version, without SYLVER A70 tubes for SCALP Naval, and cost €470m.

Construction and career 
Mohammed VI is the largest and most powerful frigate in Africa (with the Egyptian frigate Tahya Misr, of the same class). Mohammed VI was launched on 14 September 2011 and handed over on 30 January 2014. The ship was commissioned on 30 January 2014. Her homeport is Ksar es-Seghir.

References

External links 

2011 ships
Ships built in France
FREMM multipurpose frigates
Frigates of the Royal Moroccan Navy